Thomas Richard Hare (29 August 1922 – 18 July 2010) was the Suffragan Bishop of Pontefract from 1971 until 1992.

Life
He was born on 29 August 1922 and educated at Marlborough College and Trinity College, Oxford. After World War II service with the RAF he was ordained  in 1950 and began his ecclesiastical career with a curacy at Haltwhistle. Following this  he was chaplain to the Bishop of Manchester and then a canon residentiary at Carlisle Cathedral. Appointed Archdeacon of Westmorland and Furness in 1965, he was appointed to the episcopate seven years later and retired in 1992.

References

Archdeacons of Westmorland and Furness
20th-century Church of England bishops
Bishops of Pontefract
People educated at Marlborough College
Alumni of Trinity College, Oxford
Royal Air Force personnel of World War II
1922 births
2010 deaths